Lennie Baker (April 18, 1946 – February 24, 2016) was an American singer and saxophone player for the 1950s rock group, Danny and the Juniors.

Baker was born in Whitman, Massachusetts. He went on to become a member of the  musical group Sha Na Na, doing vocals and playing sax. He toured with the group, and appeared with them on the television series, Sha Na Na, which aired from 1978 to 1981. He was also in the movie Grease with them, singing lead on the song "Blue Moon". He appeared in several other movies with the group, as well.

Baker graduated from Whitman-Hanson Regional High School and Northeastern University in Boston, Massachusetts, where he joined Phi Kappa Tau fraternity.

Later life and death
Baker retired in 2000 to Martha's Vineyard in Massachusetts. In January 2014, Lennie returned to support his alma mater, Whitman Hanson Regional High School and its drama club's production of Grease, singing "Blue Moon" as he did in the motion picture to a capacity crowd. He died on February 24, 2016, in Weymouth, Massachusetts, at the age of 69. He had been hospitalized with an infection.  He was survived by his former wife  Laura  Campbell  (1980-1989), 3 brothers, nieces and nephews and grandnieces and grandnephews.

Movie appearances
 1972 - Dynamite Chicken - as himself with Sha Na Na
 1978 - Grease - with Sha Na Na as Johnny Casino and the Gamblers
 1994 -  Woodstock Diary - as himself with Sha Na Na
 2003 -  Festival Express - as himself with Sha Na Na

References

External links
 
 Spellbinders site
 Answers.com
 Yahoo Music biography
 Official Sha Na Na site

1946 births
2016 deaths
People from Whitman, Massachusetts
American rock singers
Northeastern University alumni
Danny & the Juniors members
Sha Na Na members
Whitman-Hanson Regional High School alumni